Izharulhaq Naveed (born 10 November 2003) is an Afghan cricketer. He made his List A debut for Kabul Province in the 2019 Afghanistan Provincial Challenge Cup tournament on 31 July 2019.

References

External links
 

2003 births
Living people
Afghan cricketers
Place of birth missing (living people)